Rozseč may refer to the following places in the Czech Republic:

 Rozseč (Jihlava District)
 Rozseč (Žďár nad Sázavou District)
 Rozseč nad Kunštátem